Nimrod is a fictional character appearing in American comic books published by Marvel Comics. The character first appeared in The Uncanny X-Men (#191) (March 1985), and was created by writer Chris Claremont and artist John Romita Jr.

Hailing from the "Days of Future Past" timeline, Nimrod is a powerful, virtually indestructible descendant of the robotic mutant-hunting Sentinels. His name is derived from the biblical figure described in Genesis as "a mighty hunter".

Publication history
The character was created by writer Chris Claremont and artist John Romita Jr., and first appeared in X-Men #191 (March 1985). Nimrod made subsequent appearances in The Uncanny X-Men #193-194 (May–June 1985), #197 (September 1985), #208-209 (August–September 1986), #246-247 (July–August 1989), X-Force #35 (June 1994), Cable & Machine Man Annual #1 (Annual 1998), Mutant X #10 (July 1999), Weapon X: Days of Future Now #1 (September 2005), #4 (December 2005), New X-Men vol. 2 #22 (March 2006), #25-31 (June–December 2006), #36 (May 2007), New Warriors vol. 4 #3 (October 2007), X-Factor vol. 3 #23 (November 2007), X-Force vol. 3 #1-2 (April–May 2008), and Powers of X #1-3 (July–August 2019)

Nimrod received an entry in The Official Handbook of the Marvel Universe Deluxe Edition #9.

Fictional character biography
Nimrod is a mutant-hunting Sentinel from an alternative future and was created by the Sentinels ruling that timeline. 
When Rachel Summers travels backwards in time to the present, he follows Rachel. Although not capable of time travel by himself he was transported back in time by Doctor Strange and Magik using their powers to change time to prevent Kulan Gath's occupation of New York. Thus Nimrod saves the life of construction worker Jaime Rodriguez by slaying a mugger (Kulan Gath's destined host), who would have otherwise killed Rodriguez. In gratitude Rodriguez offers Nimrod a job and a home with his family, not realizing who or what the shape-shifting Sentinel truly is.

After gathering information about the timeline in which he finds himself, Nimrod eventually changes his prime directive from the extermination of all mutants, having determined that such widespread destruction is not necessary in this era, to only the extermination of mutants who were regarded as outlaws by the government, such as the X-Men. He fights the Juggernaut. He hunts Summers and the X-Men, but is defeated by Rogue when Rogue absorbs the mutant powers of Nightcrawler, Kitty Pryde and Colossus. Based on a plan that Kitty conceives before losing consciousness, Rogue uses Nightcrawler's teleportation to teleport part of Nimrod's body away, with Rogue's and Colossus's combined invulnerability protecting Rogue from the resulting physical strain in a manner that Nightcrawler could not have handled. Some time after this, Nimrod garners a reputation with the public of New York City as a heroic vigilante, assuming he is simply a man in powered armor. He also adopts the more human personality Nicholas Hunter as part of a cover alias as a construction worker.

Nimrod later faces the combined forces of the X-Men and the Hellfire Club and proves himself as a powerful threat, killing Black Rook Friedrich Von Roehm, causing Harry Leland's fatal heart attack, nearly killing Nightcrawler and badly injuring Rogue and Sebastian Shaw.

When Nimrod comes across a piece of the gigantic Sentinel Master Mold while working on a construction site, his programming is immediately co-opted; Master Mold merges with Nimrod, using its systems to rebuild Nimrod in its own image. The X-Men are initially hard pressed to defeat the reborn Master Mold, but Nimrod comes to their aid, claiming he has evolved as well and no longer views them or mutants as a threat. Nimrod asserts enough control over Master Mold to render it immobile, and even convinces it that it has become a mutant as well. Thus, to fulfill its prime directive to exterminate mutants, it must self-destruct. The remains of both robots are pushed through the Siege Perilous, a mystical gateway that causes all who passed through it to be reborn with new bodies. Though the exact moment is unclear, Nimrod and Master Mold are merged into the being Bastion, a man who had absolutely no memory of his former existence.

In X-Force, a modern-day version of Nimrod appears. Created by an offshoot of Project Wideawake, this version is based on the technology derived from the Nimrod from the future. In truth, between the time of Nimrod's first arrival and its apparent destruction when it merged with the Master Mold and had traveled through the Siege Perilous, it had taken precautionary measures to ensure its survival. By downloading a self-awareness program into the base's military computer cybernet, the program served as a sleeper virus that awaited the opportunity to access a Sentinel development program so it could use it to re-create Nimrod itself. Nimrod's detection of the invading X-Force had caused it to act before it had originally intended to fulfill its imperative. It deactivates itself when Cable convinces Nimrod that its earlier creation in the timeline would cause a paradox and incalculable damage to the timestream.

Reverend William Stryker later found a damaged Nimrod as it enters the Marvel timeline from an alternate one. Immobilized, Stryker secretly uses Nimrod's memories of future events to give him the appearance of precognition to his followers and to help plan an attack on the X-Men and other mutants, but Nimrod alters its memories to facilitate its own escape, and Stryker is defeated. During the New X-Men story arc "Nimrod", it searches for Forge, whom it believes is its creator. Nimrod believes Forge can repair its damaged body, but Forge instead transfers Nimrod's programming into a new chassis which Forge can control. Believing Forge to be in danger, the New X-Men travel to his workshop to help him. This eventually leads to Nimrod gaining control over his body and attacking Forge and the New X-Men. Nimrod is defeated when Surge overloads Nimrod's temporal unit, blasting Nimrod out of the timestream. Nimrod survives and travels back in time to March 1985, where the events involving Jaime Rodriguez and Kulan Gath's amulet play out exactly as they had originally with its memory corrupted, resulting in its existence in the 'true' timeline — with Rachel's history erased — becoming a temporal paradox.

The series X-Force reveals that the Purifiers held on to most of Nimrod's original body and fuse it with Bastion's head to reform Bastion. He then, using the Technarch transmode virus, revives numerous villains that have destroyed many mutants.

During the events of Second Coming, he personally confronts Hope Summers, Rogue and Nightcrawler, leading to the death of the latter. Bastion appears to be reverting more and more to fully being Nimrod. Some time later, Bastion unleashes an endless horde of Nimrods from an unknown future to destroy the X-Men. However, X-Force, Cypher and Cable go to that future and destroy the Master Mold controlling them. At the end of the crossover, the original Nimrod (Bastion) takes his original form but is destroyed by Hope. The chest and head of Nimrod are later shown to be exhibited in X-Force Headquarters. Deathlok identifies it as version 32.1 and the possibility for its future to come to be is 1.34%.

During a brief glimpse three months into the future seen in Uncanny Avengers, Havok, Scarlet Witch and Sunfire are shown fleeing from a new model of Sentinel. Havok refers to the machines as Nimrod units, and mentions that they were built by Tony Stark.

Dawn of X
In this new X-Men timeline of Dawn of X, "Nimrod the Lesser" is seen 90 years in the future, along with "Nimrod the Greater" seen 990 years in the future. It was soon revealed that a human coalition of scientists and espionage agents from various secret agencies have joined forces to form Orchis, the ultimate mutant-fighting organization. Along with the former X-Man Omega Sentinel and built on the remains of Sol's Hammer, they have created the Orchis Forge solar orbiting space station which serves as a construction platform for the Mother Mold, a Master Mold capable of creating other Master Mold Sentinels. After intel provided by Moira MacTaggart suggests that this event is the probable origin of the Nimrod Sentinels, a team of X-Men invade the Orchis Forge and successfully decouple the giant Sentinel before it fully awakens, sending it plummeting into the sun.

Later, on the Orchis Forge, it is discovered by Mystique during an infiltration mission that Director Killian Devo has completed work on an unknown component that Dr. Alia Gregor installs inside the torso of a Nimrod unit that is in the initial stages of construction.

At the behest of Xavier and Magneto, Mystique returns for a final desperate mission in the Orchis Forge to detonate a mini-black hole bomb designed by Forge capable of annihilating the entire station. Her mission coincides with Dr. Gregor preparing to resurrect her husband, Captain Erasmus Mendel, who was killed in the original Orchis raid, into the chassis of her newly constructed Sentinel prototype. The activation succeeds and the crystalline memory transfer is successful, but the Erasmus persona prototype immediately detects the disguised Mystique as a Mutant and sacrifices itself to save the Orchis base by teleporting into space with the bomb she has triggered, leaving two emotionless duplicates without Erasmus' memory core yet uploaded to subdue Mystique before she can escape the station, and to protect Dr. Gregor. Executing Mystique through the entrance of her Krakoa escape portal, the fearsome Sentinel announces his existence as "Nimrod, The Hunter" to the X-Men, who have failed once again in their attempt to destroy Orchis, vowing to hunt down and kill all Mutants.

Aware of Nimrod's creation by Orchis, Bishop, who refers to the prototype as "Nimrod 2.0", advises the X-Men, the Hellfire Club and X-Force about the formation of a highly specialized strike team that has experience fighting Nimrod Sentinels in the past and to create unorthodox weapons and strategies to deal with Orchis' new threat.

Having failed on all sixteen attempts to destroy the Orchis Forge, at the cost of numerous deaths and resurrections of nearly every X-Man involved in the attacks, Nimrod, who Dr. Alia Gregor laments is no longer carrying the Erasmus persona, has proven to be unstoppable. Moira MacTaggart warns Xavier and Magneto that it will only be a few short years before Nimrod evolves beyond Orchis' control.

Powers and abilities
Nimrod is the most advanced form of Sentinel robot. Nimrod can convert his outward appearance to resemble that of an ordinary human being. Nimrod can also reconstruct himself so as to make improvements in his robotic form and internal systems that will make him a more formidable opponent. Even when smashed to pieces, Nimrod can reintegrate the portions of his body to become whole again. Apparently Nimrod's electronic consciousness can somehow exist independently of his physical body, at least temporarily. Physically Nimrod is categorized in the "Official Handbook of the Marvel Universe" as possessing "Class 100" strength because Nimrod could engage the Juggernaut in hand-to-hand combat.

Nimrod contains highly advanced computer systems as well as scanning devices that make it possible for him to determine whether a human being is a superhuman or not; if they are, he can determine the nature of their superhuman abilities. Like present day Sentinels, Nimrod can draw upon devices and systems within his robotic body to cope with or neutralize an opponent's superhuman power once he has determined the nature of that power.

Nimrod is capable of projecting energy blasts, magnetic energy to levitate material, create force fields, and can teleport. Nimrod has a weakness for elemental attacks such as lightning or extreme cold.

Other versions

Ultimate Marvel
The Ultimate Marvel reality featured Nimrod-esque Sentinels as new Sentinels developed by the US government after the Ultimatum Wave. One such model chases and successfully takes down Rogue until rescued by Kitty Pryde. They are eventually infused with William Stryker's brain-patterns when manifesting mutant powers for the first time in years. The Nimrod Sentinels later build a base for their operations based for Master Mold.

In other media

Television
 Nimrod appears in X-Men: The Animated Series.
 Nimrod makes a non-speaking cameo appearance in a vision of the future depicted in the X-Men: Evolution two-part series finale "Ascension".
 A Nimrod-esque concept called Sentinel Hounds appear in Wolverine and the X-Men. The Sentinel Hounds are based on Bolivar Trask's experiments to replicate Wolverine's healing factor.

Film
Nimrod served as inspiration for X-Men: Days of Future Pasts Mark-X Sentinels. Hailing from a dystopian future where humanity and mutants are nearly extinct, the Mark-X Sentinels have the ability to alter their bodies to mimic and counter mutant abilities as well as reshape their arms into blades and emitters in their heads that can fire powerful energy beams.

Video games
 Nimrod appears as a recurring boss in the X-Men arcade game.
 Nimrod appears as a boss in X-Men: Gamesmaster's Legacy.
 Nimrod and a Nimrod Series MK IV Sentinel appear in Marvel: Avengers Alliance.
 Nimrod appears Marvel Contest of Champions
 Nimrod appears as a boss in The Uncanny X-Men - Days Of Future Past.
 Nimrod appears as an alternate skin for a Sentinel in Marvel: Future Fight.
 Nimrod appears as in Marvel Snap.

References

External links
 Nimrod at Marvel Universe Wiki

Characters created by Chris Claremont
Characters created by John Romita Jr.
Comics characters introduced in 1985
Fictional characters from parallel universes
Fictional characters with energy-manipulation abilities
Fictional murderers
Marvel Comics characters who are shapeshifters
Marvel Comics characters who can teleport
Marvel Comics characters with accelerated healing
Marvel Comics characters with superhuman strength
Marvel Comics male supervillains
Marvel Comics robots